Rive is a comune (municipality) in the Province of Vercelli in the Italian region Piedmont, located about  northeast of Turin and about  south of Vercelli.

Rive borders the following municipalities: Balzola, Costanzana, Pertengo, Stroppiana, and Villanova Monferrato.

Demographic evolution

References

Cities and towns in Piedmont